The Road is a 1963 British television play by Nigel Kneale. It was broadcast as part of the BBC Television anthology drama series First Night. An Australian remake was aired the following year.  No recordings of the production on either video or audio are known to exist. The script for The Road was published alongside those for Kneale's teleplays The Year of the Sex Olympics and The Stone Tape under the title The Year of the Sex Olympics and Other TV Plays in 1976.

Premise
It is the late 18th century. A small English village is haunted by ghostly apparitions. Sir Timothy Hassall, accompanied by his friend Gideon Cole, investigate.

Cast
 Gideon Cobb — John Phillips
 Sir Timothy Hassell — James Maxwell
 Lavinia — Ann Bell
 Sam Towler — Rodney Bewes
 Tetsy — Meg Ritchie
 Lukey Chase — Victor Platt
 Big Jeff — David King
 Landlord — Reg Lever
 Villagers — Richard Beale, Beaufoy Milton

Significance
"The Road", initially presented as a ghost story, has a science fiction twist ending, making it ultimately a story of science fiction horror.  The original 1963 BBC production has been called "one of the great missing masterpieces of British television." Having been wiped by the BBC, it is unknown if a copy of the play exists.

1964 Australian Version

The play was filmed the following year for Australian TV. As with the original British production, all recordings are thought to have been destroyed after transmission.

Australian TV drama was relatively rare at the time and only occasionally produced science fiction. Other examples of Australian science fiction on TV include The End Begins (1961), Tomorrow's Child (1957) and The Stranger.

Of the play, director Patrick Barton said "the utopian rationalism of Cobb matched against the semi credulous tumbling semi scientific mind of Hassall are an example of two forces alive in the 18th century."

Cast
Norman Kaye as Sir Timothy Hassall
Alexander Archdale as Gideon Cobb
Martin Magee as Sam Towler
Ernest Parham as Jethro
Joy Mitchell as Livinia
Judith Arthy as Tetsy

Reception
The Sydney Morning Herald review complained that the story was "too feeble to stand up to scrutiny".

Radio play adaptation
A BBC Radio 4 audio adaptation, written by Toby Hadoke and directed by Charlotte Riches, aired on 27 October 2018. The production starred Mark Gatiss as Gideon Cobb, Adrian Scarborough as Sir Timothy Hassall and Hattie Morahan as Lady Lavinia Hassall.

References

External links

Original BBC production at IMDb

1963 British television episodes
1964 television plays
1960s Australian television plays
Lost BBC episodes
BBC science fiction television shows